Information and Communication Technology Academy of Kerala is an organisation established by Government of Kerala to enhance the quality of graduates in the information technology sector and to generate resources for increasing the employability of students. The project of setting up the Academy was initiated by Ministry of Information and Communications Technology, Government of India. Even though the proposal for setting up such an Academy was given formal approval in 2008, due to indecisiveness in choosing the implementing agency, the project continued to remain on paper. In December 2013, Government of Kerala appointed S.D. Shibulal, chief executive officer and managing director of Infosys, as the Chairman of the Board of Governors of the Academy. The Board of Director of ICT Academy of Kerala appoint Mr.Santhosh Kurup as the Chief Executive Officer. He joined on 14 March 2014. The Registered office of ICT Academy of Kerala is at Thejaswini Building, Technopark Campus, Karyavattom, Trivandrum.

Inauguration

ICT Academy was officially inaugurated by Chief Minister of Kerala Mr. Oommen Chandy on 24 June 2014 at a function held in Thiruvananthapuram in the presence of Education Minister P.K. Abdu Rabb, Additional Chief Secretary V. Somasundaram, and Higher Education Principal Secretary K.M. Abraham.

The Chief Minister also released the logo of the ICT Academy and Education Minister P.K. Abdu Rabb launched the academy’s website and learning management system called ‘Paatshala’.

Training Programs
1) Effective Course Delivery using Moodle
The main topics covered are :-
 Why Moodle?
 Creation of Courses.
 Forum Creation.
 Calendar Configuration
 Chat Configuration.
 Creation of Lesson
 Assignment Creation
 Quiz
 Plugins
 Attendance
 Virtual Programming Lab
 Themes
 Survey & Feedback
 Workshop
 Bulk Uploads
 Grading & Report Generation

References

External links
 ICT Academy of Kerala official website

State agencies of Kerala
Colleges in Thiruvananthapuram
Research institutes in Thiruvananthapuram
2008 establishments in Kerala
Educational institutions established in 2008